Manga is the name of several rural localities in Pryazhinsky District of the Republic of Karelia, Russia:
Manga (settlement), Republic of Karelia, a settlement
Manga (village), Republic of Karelia, a village